The county of Merseyside created in 1974 has 15 parliamentary constituencies
— (sub-classified into 12 of borough type and three of county status affecting the level of expenses permitted and status of returning officer).  The area, centred on its largest city of Liverpool, has since that year elected a majority of Labour Party MPs moreover since 1997 at least 13 of 15 seats have been held or won by the party at each general election.  The two other largest parties nationally in England have to date won intermittently in the two larger seats within the four in the Wirral, the peninsula facing Liverpool, and best having alternately represented the seat centred on the coastal strip in and around the leisure resort of Southport.  The latter town includes Birkdale and Ainsdale beach and has not since the seat was created in 1885 sided with the Labour Party.  The bulk of seats especially towards the east and the centre of Liverpool have not sided with the Conservative Party since that party actively supported the National Labour Organisation (1931-1947).

Constituencies

2010 boundary changes 
Under the Fifth Periodic Review of Westminster constituencies, the Boundary Commission for England decided to reduce the number of seats in Merseyside from 16 to 15, leading to significant changes. The two Knowsley seats were abolished, with a single Knowsley constituency created. Parts of Knowsley North and Sefton East were added to the new constituency of Sefton Central, which replaced Crosby, and parts of Knowsley South were added to the new constituency of Garston and Halewood, which replaced Liverpool, Garston.

Proposed boundary changes 
See 2023 Periodic Review of Westminster constituencies for further details.

Following the abandonment of the Sixth Periodic Review (the 2018 review), the Boundary Commission for England formally launched the 2023 Review on 5 January 2021. Initial proposals were published on 8 June 2021 and, following two periods of public consultation, revised proposals were published on 8 November 2022. Final proposals will be published by 1 July 2023.

The commission has proposed that Merseyside be combined with Cheshire as a sub-region of the North West Region, with the creation of two cross-county boundary constituencies of Ellesmere Port and Bromborough, and Widnes and Halewood, which avoids the need for a constituency which spans the River Mersey. As a consequence, Garston and Halewood would be abolished and Liverpool Garston re-established, and Wirral South would be abolished, with its contents being redistributed to Birkenhead, Ellesmere Port and Bromborough, and Wirral West. Four wards in the Lancashire borough of West Lancashire would be included in Southport.

The following constituencies are proposed:

Containing electoral wards from Knowsley

 Knowsley
 Liverpool West Derby (part)
 St Helens South and Whiston (part)
 Widnes and Halewood (part also in Cheshire West and Chester)

Containing electoral wards from Liverpool
Liverpool Garston
Liverpool Riverside
Liverpool Walton (part)
Liverpool Wavertree
Liverpool West Derby (part)
Containing electoral wards from St Helens
St Helens North
St Helens South and Whiston (part)
Containing electoral wards from Sefton

 Bootle
 Liverpool Walton (part)
 Sefton Central
Southport (part also in West Lancashire)

Containing electoral wards from Wirral

Birkenhead
Ellesmere Port and Bromborough (part also in Cheshire West and Chester)
Wallasey
Wirral West

Results history
Primary data source: House of Commons research briefing - General election results from 1918 to 2019

2019 
The number of votes cast for each political party who fielded candidates in constituencies comprising Merseyside in the 2019 general election were as follows:

Percentage votes 

11983 & 1987 - SDP-Liberal Alliance

* Included in Other

Seats 

11983 & 1987 - SDP-Liberal Alliance

Maps

Historic representation by party
A cell marked → (with a different colour background to the preceding cell) indicates that the previous MP continued to sit under a new party name.

See also
 List of parliamentary constituencies in the North West (region)
 List of United Kingdom Parliament constituencies

Notes

References

Merseyside
Merseyside-related lists